Bellamy's Mill is a historic grist mill located near Enfield, Halifax County, North Carolina and Nash County, North Carolina. It was built about 1859, and is a three-story building constructed of cut stone blocks.  It is two bays wide by three bays deep and has a gable roof.  Associated with the mill are a dam and support structures, also built of stone blocks.

It was listed on the National Register of Historic Places in 1974.

References

Grinding mills in North Carolina
Grinding mills on the National Register of Historic Places in North Carolina
Industrial buildings completed in 1859
Buildings and structures in Halifax County, North Carolina
National Register of Historic Places in Halifax County, North Carolina
Buildings and structures in Nash County, North Carolina
National Register of Historic Places in Nash County, North Carolina
1859 establishments in North Carolina